Granulomatous amoebic encephalitis (GAE) is a rare, usually fatal, subacute-to-chronic central nervous system disease caused by certain species of free-living amoebae of the genera Acanthamoeba, Balamuthia and Sappinia. The term is most commonly used with Acanthamoeba. In more modern references, the term "balamuthia amoebic encephalitis" (BAE) is commonly used when Balamuthia mandrillaris is the cause.

Symptoms and signs
GAE starts slowly, with symptoms like headache, nausea, dizziness, irritability and a low-grade fever. The CNS symptoms depend on the part of the brain that is infected. Changes in behavior are an important sign. Other CNS signs may include seizures, focal neurologic signs, diplopia (double vision), cranial nerve palsies, ataxia, confusion, and personality changes.

Some of the symptoms may mimic glioma (especially brainstem glioma), or other brain diseases, which may hamper timely diagnosis. The symptoms are caused by inflammatory necrosis of brain tissue brought on by compounds released from the organisms.

Diagnosis
The condition can be difficult for doctors to diagnose, because it is a rare disease. A brain biopsy will reveal the presence of infection by pathogenic amoebas. In GAE, these present as general inflammation and sparse granules. On microscopic examination, infiltrates of amoebic cysts and/or trophozoites will be visible.

Treatment

Acanthamoeba
Antifungal drugs including ketoconazole, miconazole, 5-flucytosine and pentamidine have been shown to be effective against Acanthamoeba in vitro.

Balamuthia

Like with Acanthamoeba, infection of the brain with this organism rapidly turns fatal in most cases. However some survivors have been reported:

Two patients survived after being successfully treated with a therapy consisting of flucytosine, pentamidine, fluconazole, sulfadiazine, and azithromycin. Thioridazine or trifluoperazine was also given. Successful treatment in these cases was credited to "awareness of Balamuthia as the causative agent of encephalitis and early initiation of antimicrobial therapy."

In one case, cloxacillin, ceftriaxone, and amphotericin B were tried, but this treatment protocol did not prove effective.

In 2018 a metagenomic sequencing analysis identified Nitroxoline as amoebicidal agent against the Balamuthia mandrillaris and 

in 2021 a patient recovered after treatment with nitroxoline, the man had been given a recommended drug therapy (pentamidine, sulfadiazine, azithromycin/clarithromycin, fluconazole, flucytosine, and miltefosine) but progressed negatively therefore with the FDA permission the regime was complement with the unapproved drug nitroxoline which was previously identified via a clinical metagenomic next-generation sequencing analysis as a compound that could be repurposed as possible amoebicidal agent against Balamuthia mandrillaris, the cerebral lesion shrank only one week later and the man later recovered.

Prognosis 
Even with treatment, CNS infection with Acanthamoeba is often fatal, and there are very few recorded survivors, almost all of whom had permanent neurocognitive deficits. The prognosis is largely influenced by the time of diagnosis, how virulent and sensitive the Acanthamoeba strain is, and, most crucially, the immune status of the affected person. Due to it commonly being an opportunistic infection, the prognosis is generally poor, with a mortality rate approaching 90%.

Sappinia pedata can cause GAE, however only one case of GAE due to S. pedata infection has ever been reported, and the patient survived without any long-term consequences.

See also 
 Naegleriasis, an almost invariably fatal infection of the brain by the percolozoan Naegleria fowleri

References

External links 

Waterborne diseases
Encephalitis
Rare infectious diseases